Vaea Naufahu Anitoni (born 20 September 1970) is an American former rugby union player who played wing. Anitoni is the all-time leading try scorer for the U.S. national team. Anitoni played for the United States national team from 1992 to 2000. During that period, Anitoni played in 46 matches, starting 44, and scored 26 tries, a record which still stands today.

International career 
Anitoni made his debut 13 June 1992 against Canada, and scored his first try in his next match for the US on 21 May 1994 against Canada. Anitoni's peak years for the national team were from 1996–1998, when he scored 22 tries in 28 matches. Anitoni twice scored 4 tries in a single match – once against Japan in July 1996 and again against Portugal in April 1998.
Anitoni played at the 1999 Rugby World Cup, where he started 3 matches, and was regarded as a game breaker and a key player for the US national team.

Anitoni also played sevens for the U.S. national sevens team.  During the mid to late 1990s Anitoni was regarded as one of the most consistent players for the U.S., due to his ability as a creator with speed. Anitoni was a member of the preliminary squad for the United States during the 2000 Rugby World Cup Sevens.

Club rugby
Anitoni played for the Pomona rugby club, San Francisco's Olympic Club, and the San Mateo club which claimed the national sevens championship in 1997.

International tries

Honors
Individual
US Rugby Hall of Fame
US all time leading try scorer

References

American rugby union players
Living people
1970 births
United States international rugby union players
Tonga international rugby union players
Rugby union wings